A chiefage, or chevage, according to Henry de Bracton, was a tribute by the head; or a kind of poll-money paid by those who held lands in villeinage, or otherwise, to their lords, in acknowledgement.

The word seems also to have been used for a sum of money annually given to a man of power, for his patronage and protection, as to their chief.

In the first sense, Edward Coke observed, there was still a kind of chevage subsisting in Wales during his time, called amabyr; paid to the Prince of Wales for the marriage of his daughters; anciently by all, and in Coke's time, only by some. 

William Lambarde wrote it chivage. Jewish people, when allowed to live in England, paid chevage, or poll-money; viz. three pence per person, paid at Easter.

The word is formed from the French chef, head.

See also
 John and William Merfold
 Jack Cade
 Peasants' Revolt

Feudal duties
English legal terminology
Economy of medieval England